Control Data is the fifth album by British singer Mark Stewart, released on 18 June 1996 through Mute Records.

Track listing

Personnel 
Musicians
 Skip McDonald – guitar
 Doug Wimbish – bass guitar
 Mark Stewart – vocals, production
 Simon Mundey – instruments
with:
 Lincoln "Style" Scott – drums on "Scorpio"
 Jerry Tremaine – harmonica on "Scorpio"
Technical
 Tony Brown – engineering
 Anna Hurle – design
 Kevin Metcalfe – mastering
 Andy Montgomery – engineering
 Jill Mumford – design
 Adrian Sherwood – production

References

External links 
 

Albums produced by Adrian Sherwood
1996 albums
Mute Records albums
Mark Stewart (English musician) albums